Choreutis sycopola is a species of moth of the family Choreutidae. It is found from southern Queensland to central New South Wales.

Larvae feed on the foliage of Ficus species.

References

External links
Image at CSIRO Entomology
Image at choreutidae.lifedesks.org

Choreutis
Moths of Australia
Moths described in 1880
Taxa named by Edward Meyrick